Opioid agonist therapy (OAT) is a treatment in which prescribed opioid agonists are given to patients who live with opioid addiction. The benefits of this treatment include a more manageable withdrawal experience, cognitive improvement, and lower HIV transmission. The length of OAT varies from one individual to another based on their physiology, environmental surroundings, and quality of life.

Biological understanding
An opioid is considered a ligand, which is an ion or a molecule. An opioid ligand travels to the brain and attaches itself to an opioid receptor, which begins the effects of opioids. The mesolimbic system, which is the biological system that moderates the feeling of reward generated by dopamine, is the main system that is effected by opioids. Opioids stimulate the mesolimbic system to release a large amount of dopamine in the brain, which increases the effects of opioids: euphoria and numbness. The difference between an opioid and an opioid agonist is that opioids induce more intense effects and stay in the brain for a short amount of time. Conversely, an opioid agonist induces minimal effects and stays in the brain for a long time, which prevents the opioid user from feeling the effects of natural or synthetic opioids. However, the opioid receptors are still being used when an opioid agonist attaches, which prevents the effects of opioid withdrawal and can help prevent relapse. The two most common opioid agonists are methadone and buprenorphine.

Methadone
The use of methadone for the treatment of opioid addiction dates back to the 1960s. Methadone treatments usually last for multiple years, although they can last for decades. A dose of methadone often minimizes the effects of withdrawal for approximately 24 hours and the lowest optimal dose is 60 mg. Methadone functions via competitive antagonism; while the prescribed agonist is in the opioid user's body, the use of illicit opioids (illicit heroin or fentanyl) will not produce the effects of illicit opioids. Methadone has a slower onset than illicit opioids and it produces less effects than illicit opioids. Side effects of methadone may include "constipation, weight gain, reduced libido, and irregular menses" (p. 467)

Buprenorphine
Buprenorphine was approved by the United States Food and Drug Administration (FDA) in 2002. The lowest optimal dose of buprenorphine is 8 mg. Buprenorphine has fewer withdrawal symptoms upon discontinuation, lower risk for overdose, and lower potential for abuse; therefore, it is more effective for unsupervised treatment than methadone. Opioid users can take fewer doses per week than methadone. Side effects of buprenorphine may include constipation and disordered sleep.

Withdrawal
When the body goes through withdrawal, the opioid receptors in the brain are not filled with an adequate amount of opioids, which means that the feelings of euphoria associated with opioids are not felt. Withdrawal only happens when the body has become accustomed to having opioids in the receptors, which changes the structure and functioning of the brain. Thus, without opioids, the brain functions differently in comparison to the brain before the user started becoming dependent on opioids. People who have a dependence on opioids are the only people who experience withdrawal symptoms.

Psychological understanding
There are numerous psychological variables that hold the capacity to influence the effectiveness of opioid agonist therapy (OAT), as explained in Daniel Michael Doleys's 2017 narrative review. Four of these variables include likelihood of opioid withdrawal, conditioning and learning factors, patient-specific factors, and social variables.

Opioid withdrawal
Opioids are commonly prescribed to alleviate symptoms of chronic pain. However, misuse of this pain-killer impacts millions of people worldwide each year. According to WHO, approximately 115,000 people died of opioid overdose in 2017. Addiction is widespread among users and can typically be seen through symptoms such as intense cravings, rejection of previously enjoyed activities, and struggling to fulfill responsibilities due to opioid use. OAT is one suggested treatment for opioid misuse because it is commonly reported to minimize the likelihood of experiencing psychological and physiological symptoms associated with withdrawal (i.e., diarrhea, body pain, vomiting, profound insomnia, sweating, anxiety and depression) and alleviate the intensity of most withdrawal symptoms.

Conditioning and learning
A second psychological factor that can influence the effectiveness of OAT is conditioning and learning. The activity and functioning of opioids are influenced by numerous principles of conditioning and learning such as environmental cues and associations.

Patient-specific factors and social variables
Patient-specific factors such as mood, and overall psychological and neurocognitive status also hold the capacity to influence the effectiveness of OAT. Certain patient characteristics, such as distress intolerance, can result in increased opioid misuse to obtain relief from one’s chronic pain. The social environment that the opioid user lives and uses in can also alter the effectiveness of the treatment. A stable positive psychosocial environment aids in the effectiveness of OAT, whereas a negative psychosocial environment can make the effects of OAT difficult for the opioid user. OAT is most effective if the opioid user is compliant and the treatment is consistent. Counseling opportunities are also very helpful with regard to OAT's rehabilitation efforts.

Barriers to access

Stigma
Addiction is highly stigmatized, even in the medical field. Being stigmatized correlates to a decline in an individual’s physical and mental health. Thus, stigmatization is a prohibitive factor for addicts who may attempt to seek treatment. Even though opioid agonist therapy (OAT) has been proven to be an effective treatment for Opioid Use Disorder, very few American doctors have undertaken the necessary education and certification to provide the treatment. Most treatment facilities, such as rehabilitation or sobering centers, do not offer OAT, nor do they accept patients who are already receiving Opioid Agonist Therapy.

Due to risks associated with intravenous drug use, such as infections and blood borne illnesses, access to post-acute care is critical. While patients who do not use intravenous drugs may receive post-acute care at home, "healthcare facilities and infusion companies may not allow people with a history of [injection drug use] to have home intravenous antibiotic therapy because of concern that an indwelling intravenous catheter could be used to inject illicit drugs" (p. 17). Moreover, American post-acute care programs rarely accept patients who are receiving OAT.

Protection from discrimination under the Americans with Disabilities Act (ADA) are more vague for addicts than they are for those living with other disabilities. Active drug users are not protected by the ADA. Only individuals who are in recovery and not actively using drugs qualify for protection. However, individuals receiving OAT are considered to have a disability and are subsequently protected by American law. 

Advocates identify the bureaucratic red tape surrounding the prescription and administration of opioid agonists as potential obstructions to fair accessible medical care. Potential solutions include federal incentive or requirement for doctors to be trained to prescribe agonists. Another solution is the amendment of the 2000 Drug Abuse Act, which would remove the requirement of special certification altogether.

See also 

 Opioid use disorder
 Opioid replacement therapy

References

Opioids
Mu-opioid receptor agonists
Substance dependence